The 2015 Southland Conference men's basketball tournament, a part of the 2014–15 NCAA Division I men's basketball season, took place March 11–14 at the Merrell Center in Katy, Texas.  The winner of the tournament received the Southland Conference's automatic bid to the 2015 NCAA tournament.  Two programs in their second year of the transition from NCAA Division II to Division I, Abilene Christian and Incarnate Word, were ineligible for the tournament.  Three programs were ineligible for the tournament for failure to meet enhanced NCAA Academic Performance Rating (APR) requirements.  Those teams were Central Arkansas, Houston Baptist, and Lamar.  The three teams are part of a group of nine NCAA teams ineligible for 2015 post season basketball play.  With the departure of Oral Roberts to the Summit League, only eight conference teams remain eligible for the tournament.

Seeds
Only the top eight teams advanced to the Southland Conference tournament. If a team ineligible for the NCAA Tournament should finish in the top eight, its seed will fall to the next eligible team. Teams were seeded based on conference record and then a tie breaker system was used. The top two seeds received a double bye, and the third and fourth seeds received a single bye.

Source:

Schedule

Bracket

 denotes an overtime game

Game summaries

Awards and honors
Source: 
Tournament MVP: Thomas Walkup – Stephen F. Austin

All-Tournament Team:

 Thomas Walkup – Stephen F. Austin
 Jared Johnson – Stephen F. Austin
 Michael Holyfield – Sam Houston State
 Jabari Peters – Sam Houston State
 Zeek Woodley – Northwestern State

See also
 2015 Southland Conference women's basketball tournament

References

External links
  2015 Southland Conference Men's and Women's Basketball Tournament Page

Southland Conference men's basketball tournament
2014–15 Southland Conference men's basketball season
Southland Conference men's basketball
Sports competitions in Katy, Texas
College basketball tournaments in Texas